Florala is a town in Covington County, Alabama, United States. At the 2020 census, the population was 1,923.

Geography
Florala is located along the Alabama–Florida state line at  (31.007712, -86.324957). It is bordered by the town of Lockhart to the west and the town of Paxton, Florida, to the south.

Lake Jackson lies on the state line, half in Florala. Florala City Park occupies all of the lake's shoreline in Alabama.

Climate

Demographics

2020 Census data

As of the 2020 United States census, there were 1,923 people, 646 households, and 352 families residing in the town.

2010 Census data
As of the census of 2010, there were 1,980 people, 839 households, and 514 families living in the city. The racial makeup of the city was 80.1% White, 15.8% Black or African American, 0.8% Native American, 0.4% Asian, 0.7% from other races, and 2.3% from two or more races. 2.8% of the population were Hispanic or Latino of any race.

There were 839 households, out of which 23.5% had children under the age of 18 living with them, 38.1% were married couples living together, 17.6% had a female householder with no husband present, and 38.7% were non-families. 34.7% of all households were made up of individuals, and 17.8% had someone living alone who was 65 years of age or older. The average household size was 2.26 and the average family size was 2.90.

In the city, the population was 21.6% under the age of 18, 7.9% from 18 to 24, 18.9% from 25 to 44, 27.7% from 45 to 64, and 23.8% who were 65 years of age or older. The median age was 46.1 years. For every 100 females, there were 88.0 males. For every 100 females age 18 and over, there were 92.9 males.

The median income for a household in the city was $30,833, and the median income for a family was $36,435. Males had a median income of $24,000 versus $20,100 for females. The per capita income for the city was $16,344. About 15.7% of families and 20.2% of the population were below the poverty line, including 28.5% of those under age 18 and 15.4% of those age 65 or over.

2000 Census data
As of the census of 2000, there were 1,964 people, 898 households, and 527 families living in the city. The racial makeup of the city was 80.75% White, 15.68% Black or African American, 0.87% Native American, 0.61% Asian, 0.66% from other races, and 1.43% from two or more races. 2.65% of the population were Hispanic or Latino of any race.

There were 898 households, out of which 23.9% had children under the age of 18 living with them, 40.5% were married couples living together, 14.3% had a female householder with no husband present, and 41.3% were non-families. 36.4% of all households were made up of individuals, and 21.6% had someone living alone who was 65 years of age or older. The average household size was 2.19 and the average family size was 2.86.

In the city, the population was 21.8% under the age of 18, 7.8% from 18 to 24, 24.6% from 25 to 44, 24.2% from 45 to 64, and 21.5% who were 65 years of age or older. The median age was 42 years. For every 100 females, there were 82.5 males. For every 100 females age 18 and over, there were 76.3 males. The median income for a household in the city was $17,377, and the median income for a family was $21,176. Males had a median income of $27,569 versus $15,625 for females. The per capita income for the city was $11,495. About 29.3% of families and 32.4% of the population were below the poverty line, including 38.8% of those under age 18 and 26.6% of those age 65 or over.

Etymology
The name is a portmanteau of Florida and Alabama.

History
In 1818, Andrew Jackson stopped at the lake with his soldiers, and thus Lake Jackson is named after him. Since 1870, Florala has served as the home of the world's oldest consecutive annual Masonic Day celebration, through Florala's Fidelity Masonic Lodge #685 (beginning with Chapel Hill and Lake City Lodge #377), and Chapter #441 of the Order of the Eastern Star. The celebration is in honor of St. John's Day, June 24, 1717, when the first Grand Masonic Lodge in England was established. The celebration is held each year on the Friday before the 24th of June and concluding on the Saturday after the 24th.

Notable people
Sgt. Rodney J. Evans (1948–1969), awarded the Medal of Honor after being killed in Vietnam while exposing himself to enemy fire in order to protect his men.
R. Barbara Gitenstein, first female and past president of The College of New Jersey; grew up in Florala. 
Mark Gitenstein, Ambassador to Romania; brother to Barbara Gitenstein.
Ray Goolsby, former Major League Baseball player for the Washington Senators.
Ernie Manning, former Major League Baseball pitcher, right fielder, and third baseman for the St. Louis Browns.
Dwight Stone, who played for the NY Jets, Carolina Panthers, Pittsburgh Steelers; born in Florala on January 28, 1964.

References

External links
Florala History
Florala State Park 

Towns in Alabama
Towns in Covington County, Alabama